Čačak Stadium or Borac Stadium, is a multi-purpose stadium in Čačak, Serbia. It is the home ground of football club Borac Čačak.

History
The Čačak Stadium was opened in 1958. The stadium has undergone reconstruction from 2011 to 2017, in a project that was worth 3 million euros. After the completion of the reconstruction, the stadium is capable of holding 8,000 spectators.

Gallery

See also
 List of football stadiums in Serbia

References

Football venues in Serbia
Multi-purpose stadiums in Serbia